North Middleboro Airpark was an airfield operational in the mid-20th century in North Middleborough, Massachusetts.

References

Defunct airports in Massachusetts
Airports in Plymouth County, Massachusetts
Middleborough, Massachusetts